Mystical union may refer to:

 Mysticism, the pursuit or experience of direct communion between a believer and an ultimate reality, divinity, spiritual truth, or God 
 Mystical theology, the school of thought which treats of acts and experiences or states of the soul which cannot be produced by human effort
Union with Christ, the doctrine of Christ's union with Christians
 Hypostatic union, term in Christian theology  to describe the presence of both human and divine natures in Jesus Christ
 Sacramental union, the Lutheran theological doctrine of the presence of the body and blood of Christ in the Christian Eucharist.